Oxton is a suburb of Birkenhead, Wirral, Merseyside, England.  It contains 27 buildings that are recorded in the National Heritage List for England as designated listed buildings.  Of these, one is listed at Grade II*, the middle of the three grades, and the others are at Grade II, the lowest grade.  The area is residential, and the listed buildings consist of houses, dating mainly from the 18th century, a school, a gateway, and three churches.

Key

Buildings

References

Citations

Sources

Listed buildings in Merseyside
Lists of listed buildings in Merseyside